The 2023 Challenger Club Els Gorchs was a professional tennis tournament played on hard courts. It was the first edition of the tournament which was part of the 2023 ATP Challenger Tour. It took place in Les Franqueses del Vallès, Spain between 20 and 26 March 2023.

Singles main-draw entrants

Seeds

 1 Rankings are as of 13 March 2023.

Other entrants
The following players received wildcards into the singles main draw:
  John Echeverría
  David Jordá Sanchís
  Daniel Mérida

The following players received entry from the qualifying draw:
  Bogdan Bobrov
  Aleksandr Braynin
  Daniel Cox
  Karl Friberg
  Billy Harris
  Rimpei Kawakami

Champions

Singles

  vs.

Doubles

  /  vs.  /

References

2023 ATP Challenger Tour
March 2023 sports events in Spain
2023 in Spanish tennis